Kiribati requires its residents to register their motor vehicles and display vehicle registration plates. 
Current plates are white on black, it is the duty of the owner to get the license plate made, so they are hand painted, stenciled or of printed laminated paper on a wooden base.

References

Kiribati
Transport in Kiribati
Kiribati-related lists